Ronnie Renor Palmer, Jr. (born March 29, 1986) is  former American football linebacker. He was signed by the Washington Redskins as an undrafted free agent in 2009. He played college football at Arizona.

Palmer also played for the Las Vegas Locomotives and Sacramento Mountain Lions of the United Football League.

College career
Palmer finished his career at Arizona with 267 tackles, 3 sacks and 3 interceptions.

Professional career

Washington Redskins
Palmer was signed by the Washington Redskins as an undrafted free agent on 2009, but was later waived.

Las Vegas Locomotives
Palmer signed with the Las Vegas Locomotives of the United Football League on August 5, 2009. He was released on September 14, 2010.

References

External links
Arizona Wildcats bio
Just Sports Stats

1986 births
Living people
Sportspeople from Harris County, Texas
American football linebackers
Arizona Wildcats football players
Washington Redskins players
Las Vegas Locomotives players
Sacramento Mountain Lions players
Players of American football from Texas
People from Spring, Texas